BRFU may refer to:

Brunei Rugby Football Union
Buller Rugby Football Union